Jovan Ajduković (Јован Ајдуковић; 10 January 1968, Novi Sad, Serbia) is a Serbian linguist.

Jovan Ajduković graduated from the University of Belgrade, Serbia in 1991. His main research interest is contact linguistics and Russian linguistics, in particular, study of Russianisms in Slavic languages, which was the topic of his Master and Ph.D. theses.

From 2003 to 2012 he was an editor of the international online journal Balkan Rusistics (University of Sofia). Currently he is a member of the Advisory Board of The International Journal of Russian Studies  (Ankara University, Turkey).

In April 2005 Jovan Ajduković gave three public lectures at the University of Vienna and the University of Graz, Austria. In October 2006 he gave a special lectures on Contact Linguistics and Russian Internet Resources at the Institute of West and South Slavic Studies, Warsaw University, Poland.

Jovan Ajduković is best known for his contribution to the so-called "Theory of Contacteme" (Ajduković 2004) and for his A Contactological Dictionary of Slavic Languages: The Contactological Dictionary of Adaptation of Bulgarian Contact-Lexemes under Russian Influence (Ajduković 2010, 2011), which formally describes the adaptation of Contact-Lexemes under Russian Influence on each level of language – orthographic, prosodic, phonetic-phonological, derivational, morphological, semantic, stylistic, syntactic and conceptual. According to Ajduković 2004 a contacteme, or the general unit of linguistic contactology "is a quantum of structured knowledge about the dominant language influence."

Since January 1992 Jovan Ajduković is the Director of The Scientific Laboratory of Slavistics and Linguistics (Belgrade, Serbia). He has published 12 books, and a lot of papers and articles.

Professor Ajduković has been involved in the scientific project called Codes of Russian Cultures at the University of Belgrade, Faculty of Philology (Serbia). Special part of the project has been dedicated to Russian language in contact with other Slavonic and European languages.

He has attended various international symposiums on Philology, in Belgrade (Serbia), Skopje (Macedonia), Sofia (Bulgaria), Bratislava (Slovakia), Budapest (Hungary), Bucharest (Romania), Odessa (Ukraine), Ohrid (Macedonia), Island of Rab (Croatia), Herceg Novi (Montenegro), Timișoara (Romania), Porto Carras / Potidea Palace (Greece), Opatija (Croatia), Bechichi (Montenegro), Istanbul (Turkey), Szeged (Hungary), Constanza (Romania), Moscow (Russia), Tirana (Albania) and Sarajevo (Bosnia and Herzegovina). Professor Ajduković has been a member of the Organising Committee of the International Conference "Cognitive Modeling in Linguistics – 2008" (Montenegro) and "Cognitive Modeling in Linguistics – 2009" (Romania). He also has participated in the XLVI International Seminar on Macedonian Language, Literature and Culture in Ohrid, Macedonia (2013) and the 43rd Seminar of Zagreb School of Slavic Studies in Dubrovnik, Croatia (2014).

Bibliography

 Јован Ајдуковић, Биобиблиографија са прилозима. Друго измењено и допуњено издање, Фото Футура, Београд, 2015, 158 стр.   (Online Book)  (Serbian)
 Јован Ајдуковић, Руско-инословенска контактолошка истраживања. Фото Футура, Београд, 2014, 250 стр.   (Online Book)  (Serbian)
 Јован Ајдуковић, "Типологија фрејмске трансдеривације у контактолошком речнику". In: Славистика XVIIІ, Београд, 2014: 224–241.  (Online Paper)  (Serbian)
 Јован Ајдуковић, "Контактолексеме под руским утицајем у македонском и српском издању 'Руске речи'". In: XL научна конференција – лингвистика. Зборник со реферати. Скопје: Универзитет "Св. Кирил и Методиј", Меѓународен семинар за македонски јазик, литература и култура, 2014: 611–635.  (Online Paper)  (Serbian)-
 Йован Айдукович, "Вопросник 'Межславянского контактологического атласа' №2: Трансфонемизация контактолексем под влиянием русского языка". In: Русский язык: исторические судьбы и современность: V Международный конгресс исследователей русского языка (Москва, МГУ им. М.В. Ломоносова, филологический факультет, 18–21 марта 2014 г.): Труды и материалы. Москва: Изд-во Московского ун-та, 2014: 531.  (Online Paper)  (Russian)
 Јован Ајдуковић, "Онлајн лингвистички атласи и један предлог онлајн 'Међусловенског контактолошког атласа'". In:  Меѓународен симпозиум, Електронските ресурси и филолошките студии, Зборник на трудови од Прв меѓународен симпозиум на тема 'Електронските ресурси и филолошките студии', 12-13 септември 2013 година, Филолошки факултет во Скопје, 2013: 72–91.  (Online Paper)  (Serbian)
 Јован Ајдуковић, "Трансграфематизација у контактолошким речницима". In: Славистика XVII, Славистичко друштво Србије, Београд, 2013, 284–294.  (Online Paper)  (Serbian)
 Јован Ајдуковић, "Карта 'Међусловенског контактолошког атласа'". In:  Меѓународен симпозиум, Електронските ресурси и филолошките студии, Зборник на трудови од Прв меѓународен симпозиум на тема 'Електронските ресурси и филолошките студии', 12-13 септември 2013 година, Филолошки факултет во Скопје, 2013: 72–91.  (Linguistic Map – Online)  (Serbian)
 Јован Ајдуковић, "Огледна свеска 'Контактолошког фразеолошког речника адаптације'" (Реферат у облику постера са заседања Комисије за лексикологију и лексикографију Међународног славистичког комитета које је одржано за време XV међународног конгреса слависта у Минску у августу 2013. год.). In: Контактолошка истраживања, Београд, 2014 (књига у електронском издању)  (Online Paper)  (Serbian)
 Јован Ајдуковић, "Биобиблиографија са прилозима" (друго допуњено и измењено издање). Фото Футура, Београд, 2014, 153 стр.  (Online Book)  (Serbian)
 Јован Ајдуковић, "Радови из лингвистичке контактологије" // The Works on Linguistic Contactology. Фото Футура, Београд, 2012, 230 стр.   (Online Book)  (Serbian, Russian, English)
 Йован Айдукович, "Некоторые аспекты адаптации контактолексем под влиянием сербского языка в русском интернет-дискурсе". In: 'Русистика: язык, культура, перевод', Сборник докладов юбилейной международной научной конференции (София, 23-25 ноября 2011 г.). София: Изток-Запад, 2012: 33–42.  (Online Paper)  (Russian)
 Јован Ајдуковић, "Контактолошки и контактни антоними". In: XXXVIІІ научна конференција – лингвистика. Зборник со реферати. Скопје: Универзитет 'Св. Кирил и Методиј', Меѓународен семинар за македонски јазик, литература и култура, 2011: 253–270.  (Online Paper)  (Serbian)
 Јован Ајдуковић, "Контактолошки синоними под руским утицајем у 'Мaкедонском контактолошком речнику'". In: XXXVI научна конференција – лингвистика. Зборник со реферати. Скопје: Универзитет 'Св. Кирил и Методиј', Меѓународен семинар за македонски јазик, литература и култура, 2010: 43–56.  (Online Paper)  (Serbian)
 Йован Айдукович, "Транссемантизация русской контактолексемы 'чевапчичи' в контактологическом словаре". In: Русский язык в современном мире: традиции и инновации в преподавании русского языка как иностранного и в переводе. Материалы II международной научной конференции, Москва: Изд. Высшая школа перевода МГУ, 2011: 18-24 с.  (Online Paper)  (Russian)
 Йован Айдукович, "О межславянском контактологическом атласе // About the Contactological Atlas of Inter-slavic Language Contacts. In: Русский язык как фактор стабильности государства и нравственного здоровья нации: труды и материалы второй Всероссийской научно-практической конференции. 30 сентября – 2 октября 2010 г. : в 2-х частях / РОПРЯЛ, ТюмГУ ; Союз журналистов Тюменской области ; под ред. О.В. Трофимовой. Тюмень: Мандр и Ка, 2010. Часть 1, стр. 4-10.  (Online Paper)  (Russian)
 Йован Айдукович, "О первых томах контактологического словаря славянских языков, посвященных влиянию русского языка". In: Контактолошки речник словенских језика: речник адаптације бугарских контактолексема под руским утицајем. Том 1, А-В. Београд, Фото Футура, 2010, 376–386.   (Online Paper)  (Russian)
 Jovan Ajdukovich, "About the First Volume of a Contactological Dictionary of Slavic Languages". In: A CONTACTOLOGICAL DICTIONARY OF SLAVIC LANGUAGES. The Contactological Dictionary of Adaptation of Bulgarian Contact-Lexemes under Russian Influence (Vol. 1), Belgrade, Foto Futura, 2010, 395–406. Репринты: Acta Linguistica, Vol. 3, No. 3, Eurasia Academic Publishers, Sofia, 2009: 90-100; Slavic Eurasia Papers. Россия и русские глазами инославянских народов: язык, литература, культура 1. No.3, Slavic Research Center, Hokkaido University, 2010, 167–182.   (Online Paper)  (English)
 Јован Ајдуковић, Увод у лексичку контактологију. Теорија адаптације русизама // An Introduction to Lexical Contact: The Theory of the Adaptation of Russisms In South and West Slavic Languages. Београд: Фото Футура, 2004, 364 стр. (Table of Contents – Online) (Serbian)
 Јован Ајдуковић, Контактолошки речник адаптације русизама у осам словенских језика // The Adaptation Dictionary of Russisms in South and West Slavic Languages. Београд: Фото Футура, 2004, 771 стр. (Introduction) (Russian)
 Јован Ајдуковић, Русизми у српскохрватским речницима. Принципи адаптације. Речник // Russisms in Serbo-Croatian Dictionaries. Principles of Adaptation. Dictionary. Београд: Фото Футура, 1997, 331 стр.(Table of Contents – Online) (Serbian)

References

External links
Ajduković's Homepage
Ajduković's Homepage
A Contactological Dictionary of Slavic Languages – Project Homepage
Balkan Rusistics – Project Homepage
Ajduković's Official YouTube Channel
PowerPoint Presentations
Photograph Album
Public Lectures

Slavists
Linguists from Serbia
Sociolinguists
Living people
1968 births
Writers from Novi Sad
University of Belgrade Faculty of Philology alumni